Belie Belcan is a very popular loa within 21 Divisiones (Dominican Vudú) and Sansé Espiritismo.

Information
He is considered the patron saint of justice who defends people against evil and enemies within the 21 Divisions. He is considered very polite, understanding, and protective by his devotees. In Roman Catholicism, he is syncretized with Saint Michael the Archangel. He is said to work very well with Anaisa Pye, a female loa syncretized with Saint Anne. Therefore, in Dominican households, one will often find images of Saint Michael next to images of Saint Anne.

Sources 
 https://web.archive.org/web/20090508190137/http://www.papabokoylas21divisiones.com/beliebelcan.html
 https://web.archive.org/web/20090601200554/http://www.ezilikonnen.com/dominican/belie-belcan.html
 https://web.archive.org/web/20170911181248/http://www.mamamamboylas21divisiones.com/belie-belcan.html

References
 

Dominican Vudú
Michael (archangel)
Voodoo gods
Supernatural beings identified with Christian saints